Pegwood is a common name for several plants and may refer to:

Cornus
Euonymus